Stephen Sawyer may refer to:

 Stephen S. Sawyer, (born 1952) – American commercial artist
 Steven Burton Sawyer – American information science professor
 Steve Sawyer (environmentalist), (1956–2019) – American environmentalist and activist.
 Steven Sawyer, South African surfer